Eh Janam Tumhare Lekhe (Translation: "This life is dedicated to you (God)") is a Punjabi movie based on the life of "Bhagat Puran Singh" starring Pavan Malhotra.

Cast
 Pavan Malhotra as Ramjidass/Bhagat Puran Singh
 Sudhanshu Aggarwal
 Arjuna Bhalla
 Avrinder Kaur
 Jasdeep Kaur
 Master Yuvraj
 Jai Bharti
 Gagandeep Singh
 Rohit sawal
 Arvinder Bhatti
 Sukhwinder Virk
 Vikrant Nanda
 Yogesh Suri
 Vinod Mehra
 Raman
 Romi

Soundtrack
 "Aarti" by Sukhwinder Singh
 "Kanna Manna"
 "Sunn Ve Poorna" by Diljit Dosanjh
 "Lori"
 "Mil Mere Preetam" by Manna Mand
 "Baatta"

References

External links
 

2015 films
Punjabi-language Indian films
2010s Punjabi-language films